Romexpo, also known as Romexpo Dome or Romexpo Town, is a large exhibition center and indoor arena in Bucharest, Romania. It is primarily used for exhibitions, concerts, and sporting events. The complex also hosts more than 140 other exhibits and trade shows every year.

It is close to other Bucharest landmarks, including the Bucharest World Trade Center, City Gate Towers, and the House of the Free Press.

In 2018, it covered an exhibition area of 143,000 square meters. There were over 142,000 participants, including 3,500 exhibiting companies from 45 countries.

In September 2020, the Chamber of Deputies passed a law to hand the area over to Chamber of Commerce and Industry, allowing a private investment to develop a roughly €3 billion real estate project on the land. Iulius Group plans a gigantic complex that will include 14 new buildings with various purposes: offices, residential, hotels, commercial spaces and museums, plus 12,000 parking spaces.

Annual international events held
 Bookfest, International Book Fair
 Gaudeamus, International Book Fair
 SIAB, Bucharest International Auto Show
 INDAGRA, International Agricultural Fair
 BIFE-SIM, International Furniture Fair   
 TIB, Bucharest International Technical Fair 
 Modexpo, International Trade Fair for Apparel, Textiles and Leather
 DENTA, International Dental Show  
 ROMHOTEL
 Construct-Ambient Expo 
 Expo Flowers & Garden 2020
 Romtherm
 ExpoEnergiE
 Cosmetics Beauty Hair
 Rom Enviro Tec

Concerts

Aerosmith
Alice Cooper
Alice in Chains
Andrea Bocelli
Angela Gheorghiu
Anthrax
David Guetta
Deep Purple
Def Leppard
Dream Theater
Enrique Iglesias
Evanescence
Franz Ferdinand
Guns N' Roses
Iron Maiden
José Carreras
Judas Priest
Kiss
Linkin Park
Manowar
Marilyn Manson
Megadeth
Metallica
Moby   
Nightwish
Paradise Lost
Pink
Rammstein
Santana
Scorpions
Slayer
Sting
Swedish House Mafia
The Cranberries 
The Killers
The Prodigy
Thirty Seconds To Mars
Toni Braxton
Whitesnake
Wu-Tang Clan

Sporting events 

The arena has been a frequent host of kickboxing events. Superkombat Fighting Championship has held three series events at the arena. K-1 has held their largest annual show in Europe, K-1 World Grand Prix 2010 in Bucharest, at the arena in 2010. Events at the arena include:
Kickboxing
K-1 World Grand Prix 2010 in Bucharest – May 21, 2010
Superkombat World Grand Prix – May 7, 2016
Superkombat World Grand Prix – April 7, 2017
Superkombat New Heroes – September 17, 2017

The largest attended event this far was the boxing match between Lucian Bute and Jean-Paul Mendy of the International Boxing Federation super middleweight championship on July 9, 2011.

Apart from kickboxing and boxing, the arena can also host a variety of other sporting events (e.g., tennis, handball).

See also
List of indoor arenas in Romania
List of indoor arenas by capacity

References

External links

 

Buildings and structures in Bucharest
Indoor arenas in Romania
Music venues in Romania
Sports venues in Bucharest
Handball venues in Romania
Tennis venues in Romania
Boxing venues in Romania
Round buildings
Sports venues completed in 1962
K-1
1962 establishments in Romania
Tourist attractions in Bucharest
Convention centres in Romania